Maha Nazih Al-Hussaini is a Palestinian journalist, human rights activist, director of strategies at the Euro-Mediterranean Human Rights Monitor in Geneva, and a member of the Marie Colvin Network of Women Journalists. She is a journalist and human rights activist based in Gaza. She started her journalism career by covering Israel’s military campaign on the Gaza Strip in July 2014.

Educational and career life 

 In 2013, Al-Hussaini obtained her Bachelor’s degree in English and French Literature from Al-Azhar University in Gaza, and later graduated with a Master’s degree in Political Science from Al-Azhar University (2018).
 Al-Hussaini writes for several international newspapers, most notably "Middle East Eye", "The New Humanitarian" and "Rory Peck".
 Prior to her work in the field of human rights, Maha Hussaini worked as a reporter in conflict zones where she wrote about human rights violations in Palestinian territories.
 Until 2019, Al-Hussaini held the position of executive director of the Euro-Mediterranean Monitor's Regional Office in the Palestinian Territories.
 2019 - 2021, Al-Hussaini held the position of executive director of Impact International for International Policies, based in London.
 2021, Al-Hussaini returned to work at the Euro-Mediterranean Human Rights Monitor, and at that time she held the position of strategic director of the organization.
 In addition to her work in human rights organizations, Al-Hussaini works as a freelance journalist for the newspaper "Middle East Eye" and "The New Humanitarian" where she covers news of the conflict and its impact on the population of the Gaza Strip. By virtue of her human rights work, she is active in organizing Euro-Mediterranean participation in the Human Rights Council, and delivering oral statements on the human rights situation in the United Nations Human Rights Council.
 In addition, Al-Hussaini appears regularly on satellite channels, media channels, and news newspapers with which she is interviewed about the humanitarian situation in the Palestinian territories, including Al-Jazeera, Al-Arabi TV, Anadolu Agency, Al-Araby Al-Jadeed, and Kufia TV.

International award 
In 2020, Al-Hussaini won the Martin Adler Prize for her work as a freelance journalist.

Published works 
Hussaini has published several reports and articles, most notably:

Middle East Eye - "The girl who showed the world the suffering of Gaza's children" 
The New Humanitarian - "One year on from Israel’s bombardment, Gazans still await help to rebuild"
Al-Jazeera - "Disabled or dead... some victims of Israeli raids on Gaza will not return to school"
Impact International - "Beirut explosion: the path to disaster"

References

Living people
Palestinian journalists
Palestinian women journalists
Palestinian human rights activists
Year of birth missing (living people)